Idiosepius picteti is a species of bobtail squid native to the Indo-Pacific waters off eastern Indonesia.

I. picteti grows to 17 mm in mantle length.

The type specimen was collected near Ambon Island in Indonesia and is deposited at the Muséum d'Histoire Naturelle in Geneva.

References

External links

Bobtail squid
Molluscs described in 1894